Brussels' Comic Book Route (or The comic strip route in Brussels) is a path composed by several comic strip murals, which cover the walls of several buildings throughout the inner City of Brussels, as well as the neighborhoods of Laeken and Auderghem. The large comic strip murals depict scenes from various popular Belgian comics, for instance The Adventures of Tintin, The Smurfs, Lucky Luke, Gaston, Marsupilami and Gil Jourdan.

The project began in 1991 as an initiative of the local authorities of the City of Brussels in collaboration with the Belgian Comic Strip Center. Initially, the project only intended to embellish empty walls and gables of buildings in the city. It then became an opportunity to celebrate the rich comic book heritage of Brussels, which  claims to be the capital of the "comic strip".

Today, the Brussels' Comic Book Route offers more than 50 mural paintings, most of them located inside the Pentagon (as the city centre is often called due to its geometrical shape). Following its trail, the Comic Book Route is a good way to discover the capital and even penetrate some neighborhoods less crowded by tourists. The Brussels tourist association  organizes a 2-hour bike tour starting at the Bicycle Riders House.

Broussaille was the first comic book wall to be painted, based on an original project of the Belgian comic book artist Frank Pé. As with most of the mural paintings, the Belgian association Art Mural was in charge of the execution of the fresco painting.

Art Mural is an association created by five artists in 1984, mainly aimed to realise mural painting in public areas. Since 1993, it has been devoted to the creation and realisation of new murals for Brussels' Comic Book Route, with a rhythm of two to three new works per year. Georgios Oreopoulos and David Vandegeerde are the only two remaining founder members of the association, having been involved in all the projects and mural paintings, helped with a large number of other artists who have collaborated and worked together with them.

List of comic strip mural paintings

In the centre of Brussels

In La(e)ken

In Auderghem

See also 
 Belgian comics
 Belgian Comic Strip Center

References

Bibliography 
 La BD dans la ville. Author: Thibaut Vandorselaer 
 Bruxelles dans la BD, itinéraire découverte, 2004 Versant Sud, B-1348 Lovain-la-Neuve. Author: Thibaut Vandorselaer

External links 

 The walls of the comic strip walk in detail
 How Brussels Became a Real-Life Comic Strip
 Les fresques sur le site de Bruxelles-ville
 Le site de l'asbl Bruxelles BD, responsable du développement du parcours BD à Bruxelles !
 Galerie photo des fresques BD de Bruxelles, avec une carte 
 Une autre galerie de photographies des fresques bd de Bruxelles
 Toute la liste des fresques BD à Bruxelles par ordre chronologique avec liens vers pages individuelles
 La page consacrée au "Parcours BD de Bruxelles" sur le site de l'a.s.b.l. ART MURAL, qui a réalisé toutes les fresques BD Art Mural asbl
 Thorgal et Aaricia à Bruxelles

Culture in Brussels
Belgian comics
Tourist attractions in Brussels
City of Brussels